Who Still Kill Sound? is a studio album by electronic artist Kid606. It was released in 2004 through his own Tigerbeat6 imprint. The compact disc edition of the album included an extra set of bonus tracks, and Japanese and Australian editions of the disc (released through ROMZ and Valve Records, respectively) included two extra tracks on top of the standard CD track listing.

Critical reception
Now wrote that Kid606 "irreverently rips through rec-room raves and pounding ragga riots, moves on to booty-bumpin' cheerleader jams and detours briefly into goofy acid house before getting busy with some boomin' Dirty South crunkness."

Track listing

Samples used
"Yr Inside the Smallest Rave On Earth" samples Boogie Nights and  "Trip II The Moon (Part 2)" by Acen.
"Slammin' Ragga Bootleg Track" samples "Bongo Bong/Je Ne T'Aime Plus" by Manu Chao, "Amen, Brother" by The Winstons, and "Life Could" by Rotary Connection.
"Rudestyleindiejunglistmassive" samples South Park: Bigger, Longer, and Uncut
"Cex Remix I Forgot To Finish" samples "Texas Menstrates" by Cex.
"Ass Scratch Beaver" samples "Air Scratch Battle" by Com.A

Credits
Adapted from the Who Still Kill Sound? liner notes.

Miguel Depedro - production, music
Sue Cie - vocals ("Ladies" and "Roll With It")
Joel Trussel - artwork
Christopher Davidson - mastering (credited as Antimatter)

References

External links
 
 whosampled.com, which contains a list of tracks Kid606 sampled on various albums

2004 albums
Kid606 albums
Tigerbeat6 albums